Salunkhe is the surname of a prominent Maratha clan. The Salunkhe clan belongs to the Kshatriya varna according to the varna system. They are oldest of the four Agnivanshi Rajputs. They have Angiras Gotra. The descendants of the Chaulukya dynasty of the 5th century CE came to be known by the surname Salunkhe in Maharashtra and Solankis in Gujarat. Prabhas Patan, a City in present day Gujarat, was the main Thane of the Chaulukyas. The name "Prabhas" arises from Sun God's (Savitar or Bhaskar) and his wife named Prabha's son named Prabhat. There were twelve idols (respective to twelve Adityas or months) of Sun God at Prabhas Patan which were later shifted to the Kanakaditya Temple in Kasheli, Ratnagiri. Salukya-Salunkhe are the corrupt forms of Chaulukya surname and these surnames were formed. The Salunkhe dynastic clan is regarded as the largest of the 96 clans of the Marathas. 96 Surnames in the 96 Clans of the Marathas.

Titles associated with the Salunkhe group include Raje, Sardar, Naik, Sarkar, Deshmukh, Patil. Surnames included in this royal clan are Salunke, Pandhare, Masaram,Patankar, Patole, Shevale, Babar, Padwal, Magar, Randheer, Ranpise, Sonawane, Gunjal, Lahane, Vyavhare, Navale, Londhe.

Origin
Salunkhes are descendants of the Chaulukyas who once ruled the north-western India.

References

Further reading 

Maratha clans